The Lordship and Barony of Balvaird is a Scottish feudal lordship (a feudal barony of higher degree). The caput of the Lordship and Barony of Balvaird is Balvaird Castle, in the County of Perthshire in Scotland. One of the borders of the Barony was at one time the River Farg. The Barony was originally granted by a Crown Charter of Confirmation in favour of Lord Andrew Murray "of the lands and Barony of Balvaird" dated 16 March 1624. The Barony is described in Latin in the crown grant as "terrarum et baronie de Balvaird". The spelling of the name of the Lordship & Barony has many variations, including Balverd, Balverde, Balward, Balwaird and Baleward.

In 1673, a Crown Charter of Erection of the Lordship of Balvaird was granted in favour of David Murray, 5th Viscount of Stormont. The subjects of the charter are narrated in English as "all and whole various lands incorporated into the Lordship and Barony of Balvaird, together with the tower, fortalice and manor place of Balvaird.” 

The Barony of Balvaird is one of several Scottish feudal Crown baronies. The previous Lord of Balvaird was Alexander Murray, 9th Earl of Mansfield. He had inherited the title from his father William Murray, 8th Earl of Mansfield, who died in 2015. The title passed by deed of assignation  to the present Lord of Balvaird, American Brady Brim-DeForest, in 2017. Brim-DeForest purchased both the castle of Balvaird and separately the titular feudal barony of Balvaird.

Armorial

See also

 Lord Balvaird

References

Feudalism in Scotland
Scottish society
Balvaird
Balvaird
Titles in Scotland
Lists of nobility
Noble titles
Scots law
Scotland
Perth and Kinross